Gimme Dat Ding is a split album by The Sweet (side one) and The Pipkins (side two), released on EMI's budget record label, MFP (Music For Pleasure) in 1970. It is named after the 1970 song "Gimme Dat Ding" by the Pipkins. In the US, The Pipkins released a full album of the same name, consisting of the six songs here and an additional four. It charted at No.132.

Background 
The unusual alliance between two groups so radically opposed, is attributed to that in that time both shared the same record producer (John Burgess) and the same team of composers.

After the poor commercial results with Burgess, in 1971 The Sweet decided to follow their own way, when it signed with successful duet of songwriters Nicky Chinn and Mike Chapman and with a new producer, Phil Wainman.  On the other hand, The Pipkins disappeared that same year due to the brief success that their comedy act had in their native Britain.

According to the booklet of the CD version for this album, Gimme Dat Ding is considered "the first rap album", basically because of the material contributed by The Pipkins.

Content 
 The Sweet
Side one was given over to (then) fledgling pop band the Sweet and features the A and B-sides of what were three commercially unsuccessful singles (on Parlophone Records) before the band finally found fame with "Funny Funny" released by RCA Records. Despite the cover shot of The Sweet featuring Andy Scott, he was not actually a band member until "Funny Funny" and does not feature on any of these recordings. The band's then-guitarist was Mick Stewart (who replaced original guitarist Frank Torpey) and wrote two of the featured B-sides on this compilation.

 The Pipkins
Side two consists of six songs from The Pipkins with a casual and satirical content or humorous elements, in a music hall style in most songs. In their comedy characters, Tony Burrows sings with a harsh voice and Roger Greenaway with a falsetto, accompanied by an uncredited studio band that plays all the instruments.

Among them stands out the humorous song "Gimme Dat Ding", a success in several English-speaking countries around the world, composed by Albert Hammond and Mike Hazlewood.  The song was the debut and only hit of importance for the duo, when reaching the No. 6 in the UK Singles Chart and the No. 9 in Billboard Hot 100 in 1970.

Another minor success was a parody of "Yakety Yak" by The Coasters, a very popular theme at the end of the 50s.

Track listing

Side one The Sweet
"Lollipop Man" (Albert Hammond, Mike Hazlewood)
"Time" (Brian Connolly, Steve Priest, Mick Stewart, Mick Tucker)
"All You'll Ever Get from Me" (Roger Cook, Roger Greenaway)
"The Juicer" (Mick Stewart)
"Get on the Line" (Jeff Barry, Andy Kim)
"Mr. McGallagher" (Mick Stewart)

Tracks 1, 2 produced by John Burgess; tracks 3-6 produced by John Burgess and Roger Easterby
Lew Warburton - arranger, conductor on "Get on the Line"

Side two The Pipkins
"Gimme Dat Ding" (Hammond, Hazlewood)
"Yakety Yak" (Jerry Leiber, Mike Stoller)
"The People That You Wanna Phone Ya" (Hammond, Hazlewood)
"My Baby Loves Lovin'" (Cook, Greenaway)
"Busy Line" (Murray Semos, Frank Stanton)
"Sunny Honey Girl" (Cook, John Goodison, Greenaway, Tony Hiller)

Production 
Produced by John Burgess
Big Jim Sullivan - arranger, conductor on "Gimme Dat Ding"
Gerry Butler - arranger, conductor (tracks 2–6)

External links
 The Pipkins – Gimme Dat Ding! at discogs.com

References

The Sweet albums
1971 compilation albums
Split albums
EMI Records compilation albums
The Pipkins albums
Glam rock compilation albums